Havok is an American thrash metal band from Denver, Colorado, formed in 2004. As of 2021, their current lineup consists of David Sanchez (lead vocals, rhythm guitar), Pete Webber (drums) and Reece Scruggs (lead guitar). They have gone through a number of personnel changes, with each album featuring a different lineup, and leaving Sanchez as the only remaining original member left in the band.

To date, Havok has released five studio albums – Burn (2009), Time Is Up (2011), Unnatural Selection (2013), Conformicide (2017) and V (2020) – and they are working on new music as of 2021. Along with Bonded by Blood, Evile, Hatchet, Municipal Waste and Warbringer, the band has been credited for leading the so-called "thrash metal revival" scene in the late 2000s and early 2010s, and their music has been mostly influenced by the 1980s thrash metal scene as well as the New wave of British heavy metal, death metal, hardcore punk and progressive rock/metal.

History 
David Sanchez formed Havok with classmate and drummer, Haakon Sjoegren. The duo searched for a lead guitarist by putting up fliers around the Denver area, and local guitarist Shawn Chavez joined the band. Eventually, they rounded out their first lineup with Marcus Corich on bass, and in 2004, Havok recorded their first demo, "Thrash Can". In 2005, they self-released another EP, "Murder by Metal". By 2007, Tyler Cantrell had taken up the role as bassist, and Rich Tice on drums. On September 19, with this new line-up in place, Havok released their first self-released EP, "Pwn 'Em All". Tyler's brother, Justin Cantrell - also a bassist, replaced him for several tours in support of the EP.

In December 2007, Havok, having just hired drummer Ryan Bloom that fall, sent a copy of their EP and a press kit to any metal label they could find. The EP caught the ear of English extreme metal label, Candlelight Records, and soon after the band agreed to join them. Havok hired new bassist, Jesse De Los Santos, in the fall of 2008. On June 2, 2009, Havok released their full-length debut,  Burn. However, Ryan Bloom left the band in April before the release of "Burn". To replace him, they briefly went on the road with Scott Fuller, but they eventually hired Pete Webber as the full-time drummer. Burn was received quite well in the metal community, but it did not yet break them into the global metal scene. The band was set to begin touring with Primal Fear on May 20, 2010, at New York's Gramercy Theater, but guitarist Shawn Chavez quit the band the same day. Instead of jumping ship, Sanchez took up learning all the solos, and Havok toured as a trio. In September 2010, Winchester, VA shredder Reece Scruggs joined the band as their new lead guitarist. Havok then returned to the studio to record their sophomore effort. On March 29, 2011, Havok released Time Is Up. This spread through the metal community, receiving strong reviews from critics and fans alike. It became a defining album in what has come to be known as the New Wave of Thrash Metal scene. The success of Time Is Up has led the band to major tours opening for bands like thrash metal veterans Forbidden, alongside Revocation and White Wizzard; as well as tours opening for Sepultura, Death Angel, Anthrax, The English Dogs, the Casualties, Goatwhore, 3 Inches of Blood, Skeletonwitch, and Exhumed. 2012 was wrapped up for the band by playing the first Barge to Hell cruise featuring bands At the Gates, Behemoth, Mayhem, Possessed, Exodus, and Sacred Reich to name a few.

After over a year of heavy touring, Havok returned home to Denver with plans to record their next album. Havok was invited to open for Testament's 'Dark Roots of Thrash' tour at their Denver show after Overkill was forced to drop from the tour due to singer Bobby "Blitz" Ellsworth falling ill. Fans were introduced to Havok's new bassist, Mike Leon (previously of Tampa, Florida metallers the Absence), after Jesse left the band to spend time with family. Havok began recording their newest album in the spring of 2013. Unnatural Selection was released on June 25, 2013, and in its first week charted on the Billboard top 200 at No. 154 selling over 2,500 copies. Shortly after the release, the band went to Bogota, Colombia to play the Rock Al Parque festival, playing to an estimated 45,000 people. The festival also included Cannibal Corpse and Symphony X. The band set out on a 50 plus day headline tour to support "Unnatural Selection" with dates that lead up to the Montreal, Canada festival Heavy MTL on August 11. Unnatural Selection was the band's last release on Candlelight Records and on July 11, the band signed with Century Media Records.

On April 30, 2015, founding lead guitarist Shawn Chavez died at age 30.

On September 22, 2015, the band announced that they had parted ways with bassist Mike Leon (who had joined Soulfly), and had replaced him with Nick Schendzielos from Cephalic Carnage and Job for a Cowboy. That same month, it was announced that Havok had been working on their fourth studio album, Conformicide, which was released on March 10, 2017.

On May 17, 2018, the band announced the dates for the North American tour beginning on July 13 and ending on August 5. Jungle Rot and Extinction A.D. were also seen along.

In a July 2018 interview with Sonic Perspectives, Sanchez stated that Havok was going to "stop touring soon" and begin writing a new album, which he had hoped would be released by the summer of 2019. The album, titled V, was released on May 1, 2020, and is their only release with new bassist Brandon Bruce. On August 2, 2021, Bruce announced via Instagram account that he had left Havok, explaining: "As of a couple weeks ago I have officially left Havok. This is something I thought a lot about and is what I believe is the best decision for myself and the band. I wish them all the best both professionally and personally in the future. I would like to thank everyone that enjoyed what I was able to do with them musically."

On August 3, 2021, Metal Storm reported that Havok has "reportedly" been working on new material. The band will embark on its first U.S. tour in four years during the summer of 2023.

Band members 

Current members
 David Sanchez – lead vocals, rhythm guitar 
 Pete Webber – drums 
 Reece Scruggs – lead guitar, backing vocals 

Former members

 Marcus Corich – bass 
 Tyler Cantrell – bass 
 Haakon Sjoegren – drums 
 Shawn Chavez – lead guitar 
 Richie Tice – drums 
 Justin Cantrell – bass, backing vocals 
 Ryan Alexander Bloom – drums 
 Scott Fuller – drums 
 Jesse de los Santos – bass, backing vocals 
 Mike Leon – bass, backing vocals 
 Nick Schendzielos – bass, backing vocals 
 Brandon Bruce – bass 

Live musicians
 Steven Sanchez – drums 
 Dan Gargiulo – lead guitar 
 Todd Stern – lead guitar 
 Marshall Wieczorek – drums 

Timeline

Discography

Albums

Demos

EPs

Singles

Music videos 
 "Morbid Symmetry" (2009)
 "Covering Fire" (2011)
 "D.O.A." (2011)
 "Point of No Return" (2013)
 "From the Cradle to the Grave" (2013)
 "Give Me Liberty... Or Give Me Death" (2013) 
 "Worse Than War" (2013)
 "Chasing the Edge" (2014)
 "Intention to Deceive" (2017)
 "Phantom Force" (2020)
 "Fear Campaign" (2020)

References

External links

2004 establishments in Colorado
American speed metal musical groups
American thrash metal musical groups
Musical groups established in 2004
Musical groups from Denver
Musical quartets
Political music groups
Heavy metal musical groups from Colorado
Candlelight Records artists